Irwin is an unincorporated community in Cherry County, Nebraska, United States.

History
A post office was established at Irwin in 1900, and remained in operation until it was discontinued in 1954. The community was named for Bennett Irwin, a cattleman.

References

Populated places in Cherry County, Nebraska
Unincorporated communities in Nebraska